The Government of the Socialist Republic of Vietnam, also known as the Vietnamese Government or the Government of Vietnam, is the executive branch and body of the State administration of Vietnam. The members of the Government are appointed by the President of Vietnam on the advice of the Prime Minister of Vietnam, and approved by the National Assembly. The government is led by the Communist Party of Vietnam (CPV), which is headed by the CPV General Secretary, the top position in Vietnam.

Names
After the establishment of the Democratic Republic of Vietnam on 2 September 1945, based on 1945 Constitution the executive branch is called the Government (Chính phủ). The Government is headed by the President, which is the second highest position in Vietnam. Under the President is the Cabinet which is headed by the Prime Minister (Thủ Tướng).

From 1959 to 1980, based on 1959 Constitution the executive branch is named as the Council of Government (Hội đồng Chính phủ). The Council of Government is headed by the Chairman (equivalent to the Prime Minister).

From 1980 to 1992, based on 1980 Constitution the executive branch is called the Council of Ministers (Hội đồng Bộ trưởng). The Council of Ministers is headed by the Chairman (equivalent to the Prime Minister).

From 1992 to now, based on 1992 Constitution the executive branch is renamed as the Government (Chính phủ). The Government is headed by the Prime Minister.

History

Council of Ministers (1980–1992)
The Vietnamese Council of Ministers (Hội đồng Bộ trưởng) was entrusted by the 1980 Constitution with managing and implementing the governmental activities of the state. It is described in that document as "the Government of the Socialist Republic of Vietnam, the highest executive state body of the highest body of state authority." It is accountable to the National Assembly of Vietnam, and, more directly, to the Vietnamese Council of State when the National Assembly is not in session. Its duties include submitting draft laws, decrees, and other bills to the National Assembly and the Council of State; drafting state plans and budgets and implementing them following the National Assembly's approval; managing the development of the national economy; organising national defence activities and assuring the preparedness of the armed forces; and organising and managing the state's foreign relations. Its membership includes a chairman, vice-chairman, cabinet ministers, and the heads of state committees, whose terms of office coincide with that of the National Assembly. The Council of Ministers includes its own standing committee, which serves to co-ordinate and mobilise the council's activities. In 1986 the standing committee was expanded from ten to thirteen members.

Each ministry is headed by a minister, who is assisted by two to twelve deputy ministers. The number and functions of the ministries are not prescribed in the Constitution, but in 1987 there were twenty-three ministries and a number of other specialised commissions and departments. In an apparent response to the call by the Sixth National Party Congress in 1986 for a streamlined bureaucracy, several ministries were merged. The former ministries of agriculture, food, and food industry were joined in a newly created Ministry of Agriculture and Food Industry. The ministries of power and mines were merged to form the Ministry of Energy, and a newly created Ministry of Labour, War Invalids, and Social Welfare consolidated the duties of three former ministries. The addition of two new ministerial bodies also resulted from the 6th National Party Congress: a Ministry of Information to replace the Vietnam Radio and Television Commission, and a mission for Economic Relations with Foreign Countries to act as a co-ordinating body for foreign aid.

Government (since 1992)
Since 1992 the executive branch of the Socialist Republic of Vietnam is officially named the Government (Chính phủ). The current Government of Vietnam consists of 18 ministries, 4 ministry-level agencies and 8 other government-dependent agencies.

Composition
The Government is headed by a Prime Minister (Thủ tướng) and 4 Deputy Prime Ministers (Phó Thủ tướng).

There are 18 Ministries (Bộ), each is headed by a Minister (Bộ trưởng):
 Ministry of Foreign Affairs (Bộ Ngoại giao)
 Ministry of Defence (Bộ Quốc phòng)
 Ministry of Public Security (Bộ Công an) 
 Ministry of Home Affairs (Bộ Nội vụ)
 Ministry of Justice (Bộ Tư pháp)
 Ministry of Finance (Bộ Tài chính)
 Ministry of Industry and Trade (Bộ Công thương) 
 Ministry of Planning and Investment (Bộ Kế hoạch và Đầu tư)
 Ministry of Agriculture and Rural Development (Bộ Nông nghiệp và Phát triển Nông thôn)
 Ministry of Construction (Bộ Xây dựng)
 Ministry of Transport (Bộ Giao thông Vận tải)
 Ministry of Education and Training (Bộ Giáo dục và Đào tạo)
 Ministry of Science and Technology (Bộ Khoa học và Công nghệ)
 Ministry of Natural Resources and Environment (Bộ Tài nguyên và Môi trường)
 Ministry of Information and Communications (Bộ Thông tin và Truyền thông)
 Ministry of Health (Bộ Y tế)
 Ministry of Labour, Invalids and Social Affairs (Bộ Lao động - Thương binh và Xã hội)
 Ministry of Culture, Sports and Tourism (Bộ Văn hóa, Thể thao và Du lịch)

4 ministry-level agencies:
 Government Office (Văn phòng Chính phủ), headed by a Chief (Chủ nhiệm)
 Government Inspectorate (Thanh tra Chính phủ), headed by an Inspector-General (Tổng Thanh tra)
 State Bank of Vietnam (Ngân hàng Nhà nước Việt Nam), headed by a Governor (Thống đốc)
 Committee for Ethnic Minority Affairs (Ủy ban Dân tộc), headed by a Chief (Chủ nhiệm)

8 other government-dependent agencies:
 Vietnam Television or VTV (Đài Truyền hình Việt Nam), headed by a General Director (Tổng Giám đốc)
 Vietnam News Agency or VNA (Thông tấn xã Việt Nam), headed by a General Director (Tổng Giám đốc)
 Voice of Vietnam or VOV (Đài Tiếng nói Việt Nam), headed by a General Director (Tổng Giám đốc)
 Commission for the Management of State Capital at Enterprises or CMSC (Ủy ban Quản lý vốn Nhà nước tại doanh nghiệp), headed by a Chairperson (Chủ tịch)
 Ho Chi Minh Mausoleum Management (Ban Quản lý Lăng Chủ tịch Hồ Chí Minh), headed by a Chief (Trưởng ban)
 Vietnam Social Security (Bảo hiểm Xã hội Việt Nam), headed by a General Director (Tổng Giám đốc)
 Vietnam Academy of Social Sciences (Viện Hàn lâm Khoa học Xã hội Việt Nam), headed by a Chairperson (Chủ tịch)
 Vietnam Academy of Science and Technology (Viện Hàn lâm Khoa học và Công nghệ Việt Nam), headed by a Chairperson (Chủ tịch)

In additions, the Government of Vietnam also established many National Committees (Ủy ban Quốc gia) when needed. The National Committees are not separate political entities or ministries, instead they are composed of Deputy Prime Ministers, Ministers and Deputy Ministers in appropriate fields. The National Committees act as advisor bodies to the Prime Minister on social and economic issues, and coordinate actions between many ministries and agencies. Therefore the National Committees do not have any executive powers. Currently there are 9 National Committees, each is headed by a Chairman (Chủ tịch):
 National Committee for Renovation of Education and Training (Ủy ban Quốc gia Đổi mới Giáo dục và Đào tạo)
 National Committee for Application of Information Technology (Ủy ban Quốc gia về Ứng dụng Công nghệ Thông tin)
 National Committee for Climate Change (Ủy ban Quốc gia về Biến đổi Khí hậu)
 National Committee for Traffic Safety (Ủy ban An toàn Giao thông Quốc gia)
 National Committee for Prevention of AIDS and Prevention of Narcotics and Prostitutions (Ủy ban Quốc gia Phòng chống AIDS và Phòng chống Tệ nạn Ma túy, Mại dâm)
 National Committee for Search and Rescue (Ủy ban Quốc gia Tìm kiếm Cứu nạn)
 National Committee for Security of Civil Aviation (Ủy ban An ninh Hàng không Dân dụng Quốc gia)
 National Committee for Elderly (Ủy ban Quốc gia về Người cao tuổi)
 National Committee for International Economic Cooperation (Ủy ban Quốc gia về Hợp tác Kinh tế Quốc tế)

Current Government
Incumbent Prime Minister Phạm Minh Chính, who had replaced Nguyễn Xuân Phúc as prime minister since 5 April 2021, was re-elected on 26 July 2021 following a 484-0 vote by the National Assembly.

After taking the oath of office on the same day, Chính nominated 26 people to serve in his Cabinet, including 4 deputy prime ministers (1 less than the previous term), 18 ministers, and 4 heads of ministerial-level agencies. The lineup was approved by the National Assembly on 28 July 2021. Cabinet members are expected to serve a 5-year renewable term ending before the 2026 election.

The heads of other government-dependent agencies are appointed by the Prime Minister without approval by the National Assembly. Usually there is no term limit on the leaders of those agencies. The current heads of the government-dependent agencies are:
 General Director of Vietnam Television: Lê Ngọc Quang
 General Director of Vietnam News Agency: Vacant
 General Director of Voice of Vietnam: Đỗ Tiến Sỹ
 Chairman of Commission for the Management of State Capital at Enterprises: Nguyễn Hoàng Anh
 President of Ho Chi Minh National Academy of Politics: Prof. Nguyễn Xuân Thắng
 Chief of Ho Chi Minh Mausoleum Management: Maj.Gen. Bùi Hải Sơn
 General Director of Vietnam Social Security: Nguyễn Thế Mạnh
 Chairman of Vietnam Academy of Social Sciences: Assoc.Prof. Bùi Nhật Quang
 Chairman of Vietnam Academy of Science and Technology: Prof. Châu Văn Minh
 President of Vietnam National University, Hanoi: Prof. Lê Quân
 President of Vietnam National University, Ho Chi Minh City: Assoc.Prof. Vũ Hải Quân

References

External links
 

 
Asian governments